
Listed below are executive orders and presidential proclamations signed by United States President Theodore Roosevelt. His executive orders and presidential proclamations are also listed on WikiSource.

Executive orders

1901

1902

1903

1904

1905

1906

1907

1908

1909

Presidential proclamations

1903

1904

1905

1906

1907

1908

1909

References

External links
 Theodore Roosevelt's Executive Orders 
 

 
United States federal policy